"Dog's View", also called "Talking Dog", is a 2007 anti-cannabis public service announcement (PSA) created by the United States Office of National Drug Control Policy (ONDCP) as part of the Above the Influence campaign. The PSA features a dog who sits down at a kitchen counter and asks a teenage girl if she might be smoking too much marijuana. It was one of several ONDCP PSAs shown to increase cannabis consumption in teens. It has been the subject of numerous parodies and critiques, including a Joe Rogan stand-up routine, and a 2008 parody featuring Aubrey Plaza who resembles the actress in the original. The original PSA acquired over 1.1 million views on YouTube between its upload in 2008 and 2017. In 2011, Adweek profiled the PSA as one of ten that "make you want to take drugs". In 2018, it was ranked by High Times as one of the top six worst anti-cannabis ads, "hilariously inaccurate".

Further reading

References

Sources
 

2007 neologisms
American advertising slogans
Drug policy of the United States
History of drug control in the United States
2007 in American television
Anti-cannabis public service announcements
Public service announcements of the United States
American television commercials
2000s television commercials